.mm is the Internet country code top-level domain (ccTLD) for Myanmar. It was assigned in 1997. Before 1989, the ISO 3166 alpha-2 code for Burma was BU, but no .bu ccTLD was assigned.

On 12 June 2011, the ISO 3166-1 code for Myanmar changed to reflect the MM used for the ccTLD.

Description
A company run by two Australian immigrants in Myanmar, Eagle Group, set up the first Internet access to Myanmar in 1997. They contracted with British company called Digiserve based in High Wycombe, United Kingdom, to provide DNS services for .mm.  All .mm DNS queries were handled by Digiserve's two name servers acting as root name servers for .mm, ns1.digiserve.com and ns2.digiserve.com respectively. In 1999, Eagle Group's service was shut down by the Burmese government.

Afterwards, these two servers then delegated the SOA authority of .com.mm, .net.mm, .edu.mm and org.mm TLDs to the two name servers managed by Myanmar Posts and Telecommunications, ns0.mpt.net.mm and ns1.mpt.net.mm, both servers were located in Yangon.

In February 2002, the DigiServe DNS servers were hacked by pro-democracy activists, which resulted in the traffic to all .mm domain names including www.gov.mm being redirected to a website demanding the release of famous student leader Min Ko Naing for a period of three days.

In the beginning of 2005, MPT finally retook management control of .mm name space and replaced Digiserve nameservers with their own. 

Businesses in Myanmar could register for domain names within the .net.mm and .com.mm zones through Myanmar Teleport (formerly Bagan Cybertech) or from Myanmar Post & Telecoms directly. .edu.mm, .org.mm, .gov.mm domain names are reserved for official and government use. There is no whois service provided.

Myanmar Teleport's service was later shut down by the Burmese government as well, leaving government-owned Myanmar Post & Telecoms as the sole controller for all the services for internet and email.

See also 
 Internet in Burma

References

External links 
 NIC Domain Registry for Burma, Not Working as of 2017 May 04 
 NIC Domain Registry for Burma/Myanmar 

Country code top-level domains
Internet in Myanmar
Computer-related introductions in 1997

sv:Toppdomän#M